The Missing Piece is a romance, comedy Taiwanese film. It was starring by Ella Chen, Austin Lin, Tsai Chen-nan, Lin Mei-zhao and Ying Wei-min, and also Directed by Chiang Fong-hong. The film was released on May 15, 2015.

Cast

Main cast
Ella Chen as Sha Sha (莎莎)
Austin Lin as Lin Dao-feng (林稻風)
Tsai Chen-nan as Uncle Tin-Can (鐺共伯)
Lin Mei-chao as Auntie Hai-chu (海珠姨)
Ying Wei-min as The Stone (石頭)

Guest cast
Kao Cheng-peng as Lin Dao-feng's grandfather
Wasir Chou as A-Nan (Sha Sha's ex-boyfriend)
Albee Liu as Betel nut beauty
Chang Hao-ming as Truck driver
Vincent Liang as Uncle Tin-Can's son in the United States

Music

Awards

Promotional activity

TV promotion
100% Entertainment : May 14, 2015

External links

References

2015 films
Taiwanese romantic comedy-drama films
2015 romantic comedy-drama films
2010s Mandarin-language films